Leucanthiza dircella is a moth of the family Gracillariidae. It is known from Québec and Ontario in Canada, and the United States (including California, Kentucky, Ohio, Michigan, Vermont and Maine).

Life history 
A study in northern Michigan determined this species to complete one generation per year. The larvae feed by mining the leaves of Dirca palustris. They are the only known leafminer of this particular host plant.

Multiple species of wasp are known to parasitize Leucanthiza dircella, including members of the genera Pholetesor, Chrysocharis, Closterocerus, Pnigalio, and Sympiesis.

References

External links
mothphotographersgroup
Leucanthiza at microleps.org

Lithocolletinae

Moths of North America
Lepidoptera of Canada
Lepidoptera of the United States
Leaf miners
Moths described in 1914
Taxa named by Annette Frances Braun
Fauna of California